Mokriyan-e Gharbi Rural District is in the Central District of Mahabad County, West Azerbaijan province, Iran. At the National Census of 2006, its population was 25,643 in 4,882 households. There were 28,877 inhabitants in 6,772 households at the following census of 2011. At the most recent census of 2016, the population of the rural district was 30,719 in 8,068 households. The largest of its 38 villages was Khaneqah-e Khangeh, with 4,736 people.

References 

Mahabad County

Rural Districts of West Azerbaijan Province

Populated places in West Azerbaijan Province

Populated places in Mahabad County